Les Butors et la Finette is a 1917 play by French dramatist François Porché. 
Described as a "symbolical and allegorical drama",  with "shocking realism", the play was hailed as the best French drama of World War I and one of its most original.

References

French plays
1917 plays
Allegory
Plays about World War I